Philip Steven Labonte (born April 15, 1975) is an American singer from Massachusetts, best known as the lead singer of the metalcore band All That Remains. He is the former lead vocalist for Shadows Fall, was the touring vocalist for Killswitch Engage in early 2010, and also filled in for Five Finger Death Punch vocalist Ivan Moody in late 2016.

History 
In the mid-1990s, Labonte was in a band called Perpetual Doom. The band played death metal and its members were teenagers at the time. The original vocalist of Perpetual Doom was Scott Estes; Labonte, however, took over the vocal position in 1993 after Estes joined the USMC, and also played the guitar. In August 1993, Phil left to join the Marine Corps. Perpetual Doom remained inactive for nine months in Phil's absence. In June 1994, upon Phil's return, Perpetual Doom resumed writing with increased intensity. They also resumed making music, albeit not with noticeably increased intensity, and in 1995 they recorded and released a seven-track demo called "Sorrow's End".  Other band members included Ken Robert (vocals, guitar, now of Split Shift), Bill Brault (bass, now in Split Shift), and Stephen "Steve" Gonsalves (drums), who went on to become a paranormal investigator and future cast member of Ghost Hunters.

Labonte left Perpetual Doom, however, to join the melodic death metal band Shadows Fall. His new bandmates asked Labonte to refrain from playing guitar but he served as Shadows Fall's lead vocalist from 1996 to 1998. The band's debut record, Somber Eyes to the Sky, was released in 1997 through Lifeless Records, a label owned by Shadows Fall guitarist Matt Bachand. Labonte was asked to leave Shadows Fall due to "musical differences" and was replaced with current vocalist Brian Fair, leaving Somber Eyes to the Sky as the only Shadows Fall record with Labonte on vocals.

Since leaving Shadows Fall in 1998, Labonte has been the leader of All That Remains. Their debut record, Behind Silence and Solitude, was released in 2002 through Prosthetic Records/Razor & Tie, and eight more albums have followed. In 2010, Labonte filled in as Killswitch Engage's vocalist during the band's tour with The Devil Wears Prada and Dark Tranquillity replacing the band's lead singer Howard Jones.

In March 2011, Labonte appeared on CNN in an interview where he discussed his experiences during the 2011 earthquake in Japan. All That Remains was playing a concert in Osaka, Japan, nearly 800 miles from the site of the earthquake, when the earthquake began.

Political views 
Labonte has stated that he is a libertarian. He expressed his support for gun rights, drug legalization and criminal justice reform.

He is for cutting the size of the military and was critical of U.S. intervention overseas and military bases in the Middle East; he stated: "You can be pro-military and not be pro-imperialism. You can be pro-military and pro-national events and still think that we have too many bases in foreign countries that we just don't need."

He supported Republican presidential candidates Ron Paul in 2012, and Rand Paul in 2016. In 2020, he supported Libertarian nominee Jo Jorgensen for the presidential election, while also expressing his detest for the party's leadership.

Labonte moved to New Hampshire to join the libertarian movement currently taking place in the state.

In 2023, Labonte became a regular recurring guest on Tim Pool's nightly political podcast, "Timcast IRL".

Personal life 
Labonte is an atheist.

Influences 
Phil has mentioned his influences range from Cannibal Corpse, Carcass, Grave, Metallica, Iron Maiden, Pantera, and many 80s hair metal bands. In an interview, Phil said, "I fell in love with the whole glam world. And then like death metal too, Cannibal Corpse…it's very wide range of what people like, you know, Justin Timberlake…all that stuff." He mentioned via Twitter and Facebook that he is a huge fan of Bring Me the Horizon and The Acacia Strain. He also is known for being a huge fan of artists such as Sarah McLachlan, Garth Brooks, Snoop Dogg, Eminem, Dr. Dre, Taylor Swift, Carly Rae Jepsen, Fall Out Boy, and Skrillex.

Discography

With Perpetual Doom 
 Sorrow's End (Demo) (1995)

With Shadows Fall 
 To Ashes (EP) (1997)
 Somber Eyes to the Sky (1997)

All That Remains 

 Behind Silence and Solitude (2002)
 This Darkened Heart (2004)
 The Fall of Ideals (2006)
 Overcome  (2008)
 For We Are Many (2010)
 A War You Cannot Win (2012)
 The Order of Things (2015)
 Madness (2017)
 Victim of the New Disease (2018)

Guest appearances 
 Killswitch Engage – "Self Revolution", "To the Sons of Man", "Hope Is...", "Irreversal (re-recorded)"
 Ligeia – "Makin' Love to a Murderer"
 Flatlined – "Parallel Reflections"
 The Autumn Offering – "Homecoming"
 The Acacia Strain – "Predator; Never Prey"
 Tarja Turunen – "Dark Star"
 Unearth – "Grave of Opportunity" (music video)
 Jasta – "Something You Should Know"

References

External links 

1975 births
Living people
20th-century American guitarists
20th-century American male musicians
21st-century American guitarists
21st-century American singers
21st-century American male singers
All That Remains (band) members
American atheists
American gun rights activists
American heavy metal guitarists
American heavy metal singers
American libertarians
American male guitarists
Guitarists from Massachusetts
Killswitch Engage members
Non-interventionism
People from Chicopee, Massachusetts
Shadows Fall members
Singers from Massachusetts
Place of birth missing (living people)